Oakdale is a city in Washington County, Minnesota, United States. It is a suburb of Saint Paul and is on the eastern side of the Twin Cities Metropolitan area. The population was 27,378 at the 2010 census. Oakdale is the 32nd largest city in Minnesota by population.

Oakdale lies entirely within the North St. Paul–Maplewood–Oakdale school district, ISD 622, and the city's students are split into two high schools within the district. Tartan Senior High School is within the city's boundaries, and serves the southern half of Oakdale. The city's northern residents are served by North High School in North St. Paul.

Imation (now known as Glassbridge) World Headquarters was in Oakdale. Nearby 3M headquarters employs many residents of the city.

Etymology
Oakdale was named for a grove of oak trees near the original town site. Oakdale Township was organized in 1858. The city of Oakdale is the result of a consolidation of Oakdale and Northdale Townships in the 1970s, and continued to annex land well into the 1990s.

Arthur Stephen suggested the name "Oakdale" at the first town meeting on November 1, 1858. Stephen was born on March 30, 1830, in Scotland. He was the son of Robert and Elizabeth (Grant) Stephen. In 1839, when Arthur was nine years old, the Stephen family came to America and settled in Knox County, Illinois. His father was a schoolteacher and young Arthur learned the trade of bricklayer.

Geography

Oakdale is bound between Minnesota State Highway 120 on its west, Washington County Road 13 on its east, Interstate 694 on its north, and Interstate 94 on its south. Other main routes in the community include Minnesota State Highway 36, and Hadley Avenue North which Oakdale designates its "signature street" since it is the primary street running the length of the city and serves as a replacement for what the city lacks in a downtown or main street.

Demographics

Population projections put Oakdale's population at 30,000 by the year 2030.

2010 census
As of the census of 2010, there were 27,378 people, 10,948 households, and 7,152 families living in the city. The racial makeup of the city was 81.4% White, 6.0% African American, 0.4% Native American, 8.2% Asian, 1.2% from other races, and 2.8% from two or more races. Hispanic or Latino of any race were 4.3% of the population.

There were 10,948 households, of which 33.0% had children under the age of 18 living with them, 48.2% were married couples living together, 12.7% had a female householder with no husband present, 4.4% had a male householder with no wife present, and 34.7% were non-families. 28.4% of all households were made up of individuals, and 9.5% had someone living alone who was 65 years of age or older. The average household size was 2.48 and the average family size was 3.07.

The median age in the city was 37.9 years. 24.1% of residents were under the age of 18; 9.4% were between the ages of 18 and 24; 26% were from 25 to 44; 29.2% were from 45 to 64; and 11.2% were 65 years of age or older. The gender makeup of the city was 47.9% male and 52.1% female.

2000 census
As of the census of 2000, there were 26,653 people, 10,243 households, and 7,129 families living in the city. The racial makeup of the city was 92.21% White, 2.29% African American, 0.36% Native American, 2.45% Asian, 0.01% Pacific Islander, 0.77% from other races, and 1.91% from two or more races. Hispanic or Latino of any race were 2.75% of the population.

There were 10,243 households, out of which 38.5% had children under the age of 18 living with them, 55.2% were married couples living together, 11.1% had a female householder with no husband present, and 30.4% were non-families. 25.2% of all households were made up of individuals, and 7.2% had someone living alone who was 65 years of age or older.  The average household size was 2.59 and the average family size was 3.14.

In the city, the population was spread out, with 29.0% under the age of 18, 7.2% from 18 to 24, 34.6% from 25 to 44, 20.7% from 45 to 64, and 8.4% who were 65 years of age or older.  The median age was 34 years. For every 100 females, there were 93.1 males.  For every 100 females age 18 and over, there were 87.0 males.

The median income for a household in the city was $56,299, and the median income for a family was $66,680. Males had a median income of $42,371 versus $32,343 for females. The per capita income for the city was $24,107.  About 2.9% of families and 3.6% of the population were below the poverty line, including 4.1% of those under age 18 and 3.9% of those age 65 or over.

Superfund site and environmental damage
The Oakdale Dump is listed as an Environmental Protection Agency Superfund site due to the contamination of residential drinking water wells with volatile organic compounds (VOCs) and heavy metals. After extensive cleanup, the area was converted into a city park.

Notable people
 
 Jerome J. Belisle, member of the Minnesota House of Representatives
 Derek Chauvin, former Minneapolis police officer who murdered George Floyd.
 Patricia Mueller, member of the Minnesota House of Representatives.

References

Cities in Minnesota
Cities in Washington County, Minnesota